Oshchepkov, female form Oshchepkova, is a Russian surname. Notable people with this surname include:

 Pavel K. Oshchepkov (1908-1992), Russian physicist
 Stepan Oshchepkov (1934-2012), Russian sprint canoer
 Vasili Oshchepkov (1893-1938), Russian martial arts specialist